Cancer Care Ontario was an agency of the provincial Government of Ontario that was responsible for improving cancer services.  It was created by the government of Bob Rae in April 1995, and was formally launched in 1997.  The agency was governed under the provisions of the Cancer Act. It was subsequently subsumed under Ontario Health in 2019.

See also
 BC Cancer Agency

References

External links
Cancer Care Ontario
Closing the Circles, a history of cancer governance in Ontario

Medical and health organizations based in Ontario
Ontario government departments and agencies